Azwar Anas gelar Datuk Rajo Suleman (2 August 1931 – 5 March 2023), more colloquially referred to as Pak Anas, was an Indonesian politician, bureaucrat, and military officer. A member of the Golkar political party, he served in a number of positions during President Suharto's New Order regime. During his career in government, he served as the coordinating minister for people's welfare, minister of transportation, and governor of the province of West Sumatra.

Born in Padang, in what was then the West Sumatra Residency, he graduated from the Bandung Institute of Technology in 1959, and attended Syracuse University that same year. He then joined the military, and underwent military training at the Reserve Officers School in Bogor. After graduating he was appointed by President Sukarno as a first lieutenant. During his time in the military, he became the director of Semen Padang.

In 1977, he was elected as the governor of West Sumatra, following the end of Harun Zain's term. He served as governor for two terms, from 1977 until 1987. As governor, he was known for his religiosity and was popular among many West Sumatrans. After leaving the office of governor, he continued to serve in government. In 1988, he was appointed minister of transportation and later he was appointed the General Chair of the Football Association of Indonesia (PSSI) in 1991. Two years later, Azwar was appointed coordinating minister for people's welfare, before eventually leaving government in 1998.

Anas died on 5 March 2023, at the age of 91.

References

1931 births
2023 deaths
Minangkabau people
Bandung Institute of Technology alumni
Syracuse University alumni
People from Padang
Government ministers of Indonesia
Presidents of the Football Association of Indonesia
Football Association of Indonesia officials
Governors of West Sumatra
Transport ministers of Indonesia